Ileana D'Cruz (born 1 November 1987) is an Indian-born Portuguese  actress and model who predominantly appears in Telugu and Hindi language films. D'Cruz was born in Mumbai and spent most of her childhood in Goa. D'Cruz made her screen debut in 2006 with Telugu-language film Devadasu, which was a commercial success and won her Filmfare Award for Best Female Debut - South

D'Cruz established herself as a leading actress in Telugu cinema with successful films including Pokiri (2006), Rakhi (2006), Munna (2007), Jalsa (2008), Kick (2009) and Julayi (2012).  D'Cruz received Filmfare Award for Best Actress – Telugu nomination for Pokiri, Jalsa and Kick. She made her debut in Tamil cinema with Kedi (2006) and starred in Shankar's Nanban (2012), a commercial success.

D'Cruz expanded to Hindi cinema in 2012 with Anurag Basu's comedy-drama Barfi!, for which she won the Filmfare Award for Best Female Debut. She has since played the leading lady in the successful films such as Main Tera Hero (2014), Rustom (2016) and Raid (2018). She has received several awards including a Filmfare Award South and a Filmfare Award. 

In addition to her acting career, D'Cruz is a prominent celebrity endorser for brands and products.

Early and personal life 
D'Cruz was born to a Catholic father and Muslim mother in Mahim, Mumbai on 1 November 1987. She has confessed to being an atheist. Her family moved to Parra, Goa when she was 10 years old.

Her first portfolio was created in January 2003; D'Cruz called it a "disaster". Subsequent photo shoots and ramp shows led to a second portfolio the following year, which landed her advertisements from Electrolux, Emami Talc and Fair & Lovely. The latter, in particular, which was directed by Rakesh Roshan, gave her exposure and brought in several offers for acting in feature films.

D'Cruz acquired Portuguese nationality in 2014. In an interview with Verve in 2017, she said that Portugal was a part of her ancestry.

She was in a relationship with Australian photographer Andrew Kneebone. It was rumored that they had already married. On 28 August 2019, Indian media aired the news that the couple had broken up.

Career

Debut and early roles (2005–2006) 

In 2005, D'Cruz was called for an audition by director Teja, but the project was cancelled. She made her feature film debut in the Telugu language romance film Devadasu (2006), directed by Y. V. S. Chowdary. She underwent acting classes with Aruna Bhikshu, before starting to work on the film. She recalls that during filming she felt "pressured ... almost cried and didn't want to go further", but went ahead after her mother encouraged her, giving her "the lecture of a lifetime [...] at 3 am." A review from Indiaglitz stated that she "has chiseled features and a figure to die-for." Devadasu became the year's first commercially successful Telugu film, eventually grossing around 140 million, whilst earning D'Cruz the Filmfare Award for Best Female Debutant. She next appeared in the gangster film Pokiri in which she portrayed an aerobics teacher, who is harassed by a corrupt police officer. The film was a high financial success, emerging as the highest-grossing Telugu film at the time.

She made her Tamil-language film debut in Kedi (2006). Although the film did not do so well at the box-office, D'Cruz remained too busy to accept all the film roles offered to her. Her Telugu film Khatarnak (2006) in which she acted opposite Ravi Teja did not do as well as expected, which has been attributed to her glamorous appearance not going down well with the audience. She subsequently experienced a breakthrough in her career as her following releases Rakhi (2006) and Munna (2007) proved critically and financially successful.

Breakthrough and establishment in Telugu cinema (2007–2011) 
D'Cruz appeared in the 2007 film Aata. She received favourable reviews for her performance as Satya, a college student who is on the run from the home minister's crooked son by whom she is targeted, when leading a protest and demanding punishment for his crimes. In 2008, she performed the female lead role in the action film Jalsa, directed by Trivikram Srinivas. D'Cruz received largely positive remarks, with critics citing that she looked "pretty", "damn cool", and "every bit chic and stunning throughout the film", while being later awarded the Santosham Award, one of five awards for Jalsa, and the South Scope Style Award, besides garnering a nomination for the Best Actress prize at the 56th Filmfare Awards South. Her first 2009 release, titled Kick, was likewise declared a box office success, becoming one of the highest-grossing films that year.

Later that year she starred in the films Rechipo and Y. V. S. Choudary's Saleem both of which performed poorly at the box office.

D'Cruz had 2 releases in 2011. Her first film that year was Shakthi, where she essayed the lead female role. She gave a stage performance for this movie's audio release function along with Jr. NTR, as part as promotion of the film. Her next release was Nenu Naa Rakshasi, which marked her second collaboration with Puri Jagannadh. Though the film was a failure, her performance was received positively by critics; an Indiaglitz reviewer described her as a "pleasant surprise in the film" as she "cried, smirked, looked hot, grabbed sympathy and made faces that were apt to the scenes", while cinegoer's reviewer cited that the film had "one bright spot, Ileana, she looks stunning and also like an accomplished senior to the hero." Despite her recent failures, D'Cruz continued to be the highest-paid actress in South India.

Bollywood debut and success (2012–2017) 
In early 2012, she starred in the Tamil film Nanban directed by S. Shankar, a remake of the 2009 Hindi film 3 Idiots. The film opened to high positive reviews from critics praising the performance. It became a major financial success, grossing  at the box office on its first week. Her next release was the action comedy Julayi, written and directed by Trivikram Srinivas. D'cruz was featured as Madhu opposite Allu Arjun. The film opened to positive reviews and became the third biggest hit in 2012 and biggest hit in Telugu. She then starred in Puri Jagannadh's comedy Devudu Chesina Manushulu. In this film she played the role of a taxi driver. The film received mixed reviews and eventually under-performed at the box office.

D'Cruz made her Hindi debut with Anurag Basu's Barfi! In addition to playing the role of the narrator, she portrayed the character of Shruti Ghosh, a girl who leaves her true love for material comforts. The movie released on 14 September 2012, to highly positive reviews from critics, and was a major commercial success, earning  worldwide. D'Cruz's performance was well received, earning her a Filmfare Best Female Debut Award, as well as a nomination for Filmfare Award for Best Supporting Actress. Rachit Gupta from Filmfare said "This is Ileana's first film but her fantastic performance is just a testament why the Telugu audience consider her a superstar. Of course it also helps that she is the most visually appealing in Barfi! out shining even the scenic hills of Darjeeling". Rajeev Masand stated "Ileana leaves a lasting impression in her Hindi film debut, conveying both love and pain through those beautiful, expressive eyes". The film was screened at the Busan International Film Festival, Marrakech International Film Festival and was chosen as India's official entry to the Oscars for the 85th Academy Awards.

She next appeared in the Rajkumar Santoshi action comedy film Phata Poster Nikhla Hero opposite Shahid Kapoor. The film released on 20 September 2013 to mixed reviews, and the film was eventually declared a poor grosser at the box office. However, D'Cruz received mixed reviews for her performance, with the Times of India saying that she was "good with emotions but not so tuned into comedy yet." In April 2014 she gave a photo shoot for the magazine Man's World. Her first release of 2014 was coming-of-age romantic action comedy film Main Tera Hero, a remake of the Telugu film Kandireega, which was produced by Balaji Motion Pictures and directed by David Dhawan. Featured alongside Varun Dhawan and Nargis Fakhri, she played a role of Sunaina Goradia. The film released to mixed reviews from critics, though it became a box office success. She then appeared in Saif Ali Khan's maiden production Happy Ending where she played lead along Saif Ali Khan, Govinda and Kalki Koechlin which released on 21 November 2014. The film met with negative reviews and underperformed at the box office.

After taking a sabbatical, in February 2016 she started Akshay Kumar Rustom which released in August 2016. The film emerged as one of the highest Indian grossing films of 2016, more than 2 billion at the box office. Ileana was praised for her performance as Cynthia Pavri, which garnered her numerous award nominations.

In 2017, her films Mubarakan starring opposite Arjun Kapoor and Anil Kapoor and Baadshaho starring opposite Ajay Devgn both failed to find an audience at the box office.

Recent work (2018–present)
D'Cruz's first release of 2018 Raid, opened to positive critical and commercial feedback. After six years hiatus, she signed a Telugu film Amar Akbar Anthony starring opposite her frequent co-star Ravi Teja. Released amid good expectations the film opened with negative reviews and failed at the box office.

In 2019, she appeared in Pagalpanti, a comedy film by Anees Bazmee. News18 stated, "Ileana D’Cruz looks beautiful but has precious little to do." In 2021, she played a Journalist in The Big Bull, a biographical crime film, alongside Abhishek Bacchan. Times of India noted, "Ileana D’Cruz as the journalist puts up an honest performance."

She has completed the filming of Unfair & Lovely alongside Randeep Hooda. She also has Untitled Shirsha Guha film in her kitty.

Other work and media image 
D'Cruz has established herself as one of the leading actor  of the Telugu and Hindi cinema. Vogue said that she is a "well-recognised name" in the South Indian film industry. Taran Adarsh termed her "super efficient". Verve noted, "D'Cruz makes the unreal seem believable on celluloid". She stood at the 18th place on Forbes India's most influential stars on Instagram in South cinema for the year 2021.

She was widey praised for her Hindi film debut Barfi!. She was placed 2nd in Times of India's 10 Most Promising Female Newcomers of 2012 list. In 2012, Rediff.com placed her in their listing of the top 10 Bollywood actresses, where she ranked 8th. D'Cruz has been suffering from body dysmorphic disorder. She has been vocal about the "body image" issues.

D'Cruz has been associated with a number of causes. She has donated her clothes and accessories to raise money for renovating an animal hospital in Mumbai in 2013. She walked the ramp for "Smile Foundation", to lend her support for girls education. In 2016, she attended a charity event for the underpriviliged kids.

In addition to her acting career, D'Cruz is a prominent celebrity endorser for brands and products including Clear Shampoo with Virat Kohli and CavinKare with Akshay Kumar. She is also the brand ambassador of Tourism Fiji. She has subsequently appeared on Times' Most Desirable Women list ranking 20th in 2011 and 21st in 2013. She ranked 4th in Hyderabad Times' Most Desirable Women list of 2013.

Filmography

Films

Music videos

Accolades

See also

 List of Hindi film actresses

References

External links 

 
 
 

1986 births
Living people
Actresses from Mumbai
People from Panaji
Female models from Mumbai
Female models from Goa
Konkani people
Indian Roman Catholics
Indian film actresses
Indian female models
Portuguese film actresses
Portuguese female models
Naturalised citizens of Portugal
Portuguese expatriates in India
Portuguese people of Indian descent
Portuguese Roman Catholics
European actresses in India
Actresses in Hindi cinema
Actresses in Kannada cinema
Actresses in Tamil cinema
Actresses in Telugu cinema
Filmfare Awards South winners
Filmfare Awards winners
Screen Awards winners
Zee Cine Awards winners
21st-century Indian actresses
21st-century Portuguese actresses